Alan Dimmick (born 2 June 1961) is a Scottish photographer living and working in Glasgow. He is best known for documenting the Glasgow art scene.

Life and work
Dimmick was born in Glasgow in 1961, and was named after astronaut Alan Shepard. He attended Hyndland Secondary School between 1973 and 1979 and the College of Building and Printing, now part of City of Glasgow College, between 1979 and 1982.

After a short period spent working at the Mitchell Library and the Southern General Hospital where his father was a neuroscientist, Dimmick moved into a flat with rock band Del Amitri, which is where his work of documenting the art and music scene began. He was also encouraged by Scottish photographer Oscar Marzaroli.

Some of Dimmick's early works were purchased by the People's Palace in Glasgow and the Scottish Arts Council in the 1980s, and he exhibited in group shows at the Collins Gallery in Glasgow, the Pier Arts Centre in Stromness, and the Inverness Museum and Art Gallery.

In 2007, an exhibition of his work was shown at Street Level Photoworks in Glasgow and in 2012, his work documenting the Glasgow art scene was shown at the Gallery of Modern Art.

In 2017, a forty-year retrospective was held at the Stills Gallery in Edinburgh. The exhibition was followed by the publication of Alan Dimmick Photographs 1977–2017, with a launch event hosted by Timorous Beasties. In the same year, he was Artist in Residence at Stirling University.

In 2022, a series of Dimmick's Glasgow photographs were displayed in a citywide outdoor exhibition. In the same year, there was also a display of his work at the Queen Elizabeth University Hospital as part of an NHS Greater Glasgow and Clyde project to "animate public spaces."

Dimmick describes his composition style as "instinctive," but has cited as early influences Oscar Marzaroli's black-and-white portraits of Joan Eardley in her studio and Roger Mayne's pictures of post-war, working-class Londoners.

Solo shows
2007 Street Level Photoworks, Glasgow
2012 Gallery of Modern Art, Glasgow
2017 Stills Gallery, Edinburgh
2019 SWG3, Glasgow
2020 Stirling University

Book
 Alan Dimmick Photographs 1977–2017 (2018)

Gallery

Notes and references

External links
Alan Dimmick Official Site
Alan Dimmick Instagram
Alan Dimmick - An Art360 Film by Marissa Keating
Q&A with Alan Dimmick and Ben Harman in 2018
Q&A with Alan Dimmick and Ben Harman in 2022
Q&A with Alan Dimmick and Ben Harman at Stirling University in 2022

1961 births
People educated at Hyndland Secondary School
Living people
Photography in Scotland
Scottish contemporary artists
Scottish photographers
Artists from Glasgow